Kelch-like protein 8 is a protein that in humans is encoded by the KLHL8 gene.

References

Further reading

Kelch proteins